Floretta and Patapon (Italian:Florette e Patapon) is a 1927 Italian silent comedy film directed by Amleto Palermi and starring Ossi Oswalda, Livio Pavanelli and Marcel Lévesque. It is a remake of the 1913 film of the same title.

Cast
 Ossi Oswalda as Riquette, moglie di Florette  
 Livio Pavanelli as Florette 
 Marcel Lévesque as Patapon  
 Enrica Fantis as Bianca, moglie di Patapon  
 Augusto Bandini as Il primo amore 
 Lucia Zanussi as La cocottina 
 Armand Pouget as Il colonello Mombissac  
 Ubaldo Cocchi as Jambart  
 Oreste Bilancia as Il cassiere  
 Alfredo Martinelli

References

Bibliography
 Stewart, John. Italian Film: A Who's Who. McFarland, 1994.

External links 
 

1927 films
1927 comedy films
Italian comedy films
Italian silent feature films
1920s Italian-language films
Films directed by Amleto Palermi
Remakes of Italian films
Italian films based on plays
Films set in France
Italian black-and-white films
Silent comedy films
1920s Italian films